Lectionary 319 (Gregory-Aland), designated by siglum ℓ 319 (in the Gregory-Aland numbering) is a Greek manuscript of the New Testament, on parchment. Palaeographically it has been assigned to the 12th century. The manuscript has not survived in complete condition.

Description 

The original codex contained lessons from the Gospel of John, Matthew, and Luke (Evangelistarium), on 360 fragment parchment leaves. The leaves are measured. Several leaves at the end were lost.

The text is written in Greek minuscule letters, in two columns per page, 20 lines per page. It has musical notes and pictures. It contains decorated headpieces and initial letters.

The codex contains weekday Gospel lessons.

History 

Scrivener dated the manuscript to the 13th century, Gregory dated it to the 12th or 13th century. It is presently assigned by the INTF to the 12th century.

It was purchased from Messrs Boone, on 12 April 1856.

The manuscript was added to the list of New Testament manuscripts by Scrivener (267e) and Gregory (number 319e). Gregory saw it in 1883.

Currently the codex is housed at the British Library (Add MS 21260) in London.

The fragment is not cited in critical editions of the Greek New Testament (UBS4, NA28).

See also 

 List of New Testament lectionaries
 Biblical manuscript
 Textual criticism
 Lectionary 318

References

Bibliography

External links 
 Add MS 21260 Digitised Manuscripts

Greek New Testament lectionaries
12th-century biblical manuscripts
British Library additional manuscripts